The 1990 Peach Bowl, part of the 1990 bowl game season, took place on December 29, 1990, at Atlanta–Fulton County Stadium in Atlanta, Georgia. The competing teams were the Indiana Hoosiers of the Big Ten Conference (Big Ten), and the Auburn Tigers, representing the Southeastern Conference (SEC). In what was the first ever meeting between the schools, Auburn was victorious in by a final score of 27–23.

Teams

Indiana

The 1990 Indiana squad opened the season with four consecutive wins before they tied Ohio State in their fifth game. The Hoosiers then went on a three game losing streak against Minnesota, Michigan and Michigan State. They then completed the regular season with a pair of wins and a loss against Illinois en route to an overall record of six wins, four losses and one tie (6–4–1). After their victory over Purdue in the season finale, the Hoosiers accepted a bid to play in the Peach Bowl. Their appearance marked the second for Indiana in the Peach Bowl, and their sixth overall bowl game.

Auburn

The 1990 Auburn squad finished the regular season with a tie against Tennessee and losses to Florida, Southern Miss and Alabama en route to an overall record of seven wins, three losses and one tie (7–3–1). After their loss against Alabama in the Iron Bowl on December 1, Auburn officially accepted an invitation to play in the Peach Bowl. The appearance marked the first for Auburn in the Peach Bowl, and their 23rd overall bowl game.

Game summary
Auburn took an early 7–0 lead on a six-yard Stan White touchdown run, and the Hoosiers responded with a three-yard Trent Green touchdown run that tied the game 7–7 at the end of the first quarter. In the second quarter, the Tigers took a 14–7 lead after an 11-yard White touchdown pass to Alex Smith. Each team then scored a field goal before the end of the quarter that made the halftime score 17–10 in favor of Auburn. After a scoreless third quarter, Jim Von Wyl connected on a 42-yard field goal early in the fourth that extended the Tigers' lead to 20–10. The Hoosiers then took a 23–20 lead late in the quarter after Green scored on touchdown runs of two and eleven-yards. White then scored the game-winning touchdown with his one-yard run with only 0:39 left in the contest. For their individual performances, Stan White, Vaughn Dunbar and Darrel Crawford were recognized as game MVPs.

References

Peach Bowl
Peach Bowl
Indiana Hoosiers football bowl games
Auburn Tigers football bowl games
Peach Bowl
December 1990 sports events in the United States
1990 in Atlanta